John Leo Hagerty (July 3, 1903 – March 23, 1982) was an American football player, coach and college athletics administrator. He played halfback for the New York Giants of the National Football League (NFL) from 1926 to 1932 before returning to his alma mater of Georgetown University to serve as head football coach from 1932 to 1948.  Hagerty led the Hoyas to back-to-back undefeated seasons in 1938 and 1939, as well as the school's first bowl game appearance, at the 1941 Orange Bowl, which Georgetown lost to Mississippi State, 14–7.  His career record as Georgetown's coach was 62–41–10.

Head coaching record

Notes

References

External links
 

1903 births
1982 deaths
American football halfbacks
Georgetown Hoyas athletic directors
Georgetown Hoyas football coaches
Georgetown Hoyas football players
New York Giants players
Sportspeople from Boston
Coaches of American football from Massachusetts
Players of American football from Boston